AGNITIO S.L. was a voice biometrics technology company with headquarters in Madrid, Spain. Agnitio was acquired by Bigtincan in October 2020. Biometric authentication uses unique biological characteristics to verify an individual’s identity. It’s harder to spoof and considered more convenient for some users since they do not have to remember passwords or worry about passwords being stolen. Agnitio provides voice biometrics services for homeland security and corporate clients.

History

Origins
AGNITIO was founded in 2004 as a spin-off from the Biometric Recognition Group  ATVS at the Technical University of Madrid. Its products are used by police departments in more than 35 countries across Europe, Asia and the Americas, resulting in AGNITIO being considered a market leader in forensic voice biometrics. On October 19, 2016, Nuance Communications Inc. acquired Agnitio and then Microsoft acquired Nuance.</ref>

Market expansion
In addition to forensic applications, voice biometrics is generally considered to be one of the technologies (along with One Time PIN generators such as SecurID) suitable for strong authentication of telephone and electronic transactions. However, unlike token based One Time PIN generators, voice biometrics does not require the user to have any specific hardware making it more economically suitable for mass-market applications. Users simply need access to a mobile or landline telephone. This  makes voice biometrics a very promising technology for phone and on-line banking, as well as many other corporate voice applications and security needs. Automated password reset procedures, presence monitoring, time and attendance, call center user verification and verification based on free speech are some examples of typical applications that can be front-ended with voice biometrics.

AGNITIO's success in the homeland security market  attracted venture capital funding, which was being used to enter deeper into the enterprise/corporate market. KIVOX, AGNITiO's corporate-focused offering, expands upon the inherent benefits of voice biometrics by utilizing the same core technologies found in its homeland security solutions.

Technology
AGNITIO develops both forensic and real time speaker identification services, such as BATVOX, as well as speaker authentication applications (see Verification vs. identification) that share the same text-independent technology core. In addition, a text-dependent, digit based voice biometric authentication service is offered for corporate implementors.

AGNITIO's core technologies were based on the NIST-evaluated, ATVS biometrics technology, which was transferred to AGNITIO as part of its founding.

Controversy
In 2013 Agnitio appeared in WikiLeaks Spyfiles as an example of mass surveillance technology used by world intelligence agencies. The event raised doubts about some Agnitio customers.

See also
Biometrics
Speaker recognition

References

Spanish companies established in 2004
Technology companies established in 2004